Oman Insurance Company P.S.C. ("Sukoon") (Arabic: شركة عُمان للتأمين "سكون" ش.م.ع) is a composite insurance company headquartered in Dubai, UAE that sells insurance for individuals and businesses in UAE and Oman. Established in 1975 with majority ownership by Mashreq Bank, Sukoon is one of the largest publicly listed insurers in the country. Abdul Aziz Abdullah Al Ghurair is the chairman and Jean-Louis Laurent Josi is the CEO of Sukoon.

History 
In 1975, Oman Insurance was launched by Abdullah Al Ghurair.

On 06 October 2022, Oman Insurance has rebranded to Sukoon.

Products
Oman Insurance Company provides Life, Medical, and General insurance covers including products such as Trade Credit insurance. Insurance feature verticals including Healthcare, Motor, Property, Travel, Life, Engineering, Marine Hull, Aviation & Space, Energy, Marine Cargo, and Liability.

With its head office in Deira, Dubai, Oman Insurance has 11 branches in UAE along with 2 agency managed branches in Sharjah and Dubai. The company currently employees over 650 staff, a network of agents, and works with international and local insurance brokers. The company also offers regional insurance products through its wholly owned subsidiaries in Oman and Turkey.
Oman Insurance was the first to offer STP (Straight Through Processing), real-time motor policy issuance to its UAE customers in 2020.

Operations
OIC has operations across most Emirates in the United Arab Emirates, as well as in Oman, Qatar, and a subsidiary in Turkey (Dubai Starr Sigorta). OIC has over 750 employees. OIC uses 12 branches, a call center, an exclusive network of agents, international and local brokers, tenders and bancassurance.

Partnerships

OIC has partnered with international insurers to strengthen its product offering.

Bupa

OIC partnered with Bupa in 2003. OIC acts as the exclusive insurer and local administrator in the UAE for Bupa's international health plans.

Generali
Oman Insurance partnered with Generali Global Pension to give retirement insurance plans in 2019.	Oman Insurance is also a member of Generali's global network that offers multinational pooling and captive arrangements to multinationals. Oman Insurance also partnered with Generali in 2020 to offer home insurance to high net-worth clients in the UAE.

Coface

Coface is Oman Insurance's regional partner in UAE to sell credit insurance.

Ratings

With a gross written premium of AED 3.19 billion (2015) and assets reaching AED 6.2 billion, OIC financial strength is rated ‘A’ Excellent (Stable Outlook) by AM Best and ‘A-‘ (Stable Outlook) by Standard & Poor's. 

Oman Insurance rating by credit rating agencies:
 AM Best: ‘A’ credit rating with Outlook ‘Stable’ (2020)
 Moody’s: ‘A2 IFS’ rating with Outlook ‘Stable’ (2020)
 S&P: 	‘A’ with ‘Stable’ Outlook and capital adequacy above ‘AAA’ (2019)

Awards

Oman Insurance Company (Sukoon) won two industry awards at the MENA IR Insurance Awards held in January 2016 in Dubai: The Best Commercial Lines Insurer of the year 2015 and The Most Innovative Insurer - Product

References

External links
 

Financial services companies established in 1975
Health insurance companies of the United Arab Emirates
Government-owned companies of the United Arab Emirates
Companies based in Abu Dhabi
Multinational companies headquartered in the United Arab Emirates